Debbie Isitt (born 7 February 1966) is an English comic writer, film director, composer and performer.

Early life and education
Isitt was born in Birmingham. She went to Our Lady of Fatima Primary School and Lordswood Girls Secondary School and is a cousin of the footballer Darren Wassall.

Career
Isitt is best known for her Christmas comedy films, the Nativity! series, of which she has written and directed four to date. Prior to that, she wrote BAFTA award-winning television adaptation of Jacqueline Wilson's book, The Illustrated Mum, the stage play The Woman Who Cooked Her Husband, and the feature films Nasty Neighbours and Confetti.

Nativity!,  Isitt's third feature film, starring Martin Freeman, was released in November 2009. It became the most successful British independent film of the year. The sequel, Nativity 2: Danger in the Manger, starred David Tennant. Released in November 2012, and was also a financial success, making twice the amount at the UK box office as the original. Two further sequels, Nativity 3: Dude, Where's My Donkey? and Nativity Rocks!, were released in 2014 and 2018 respectively. They were financial successes, but received mixed reviews from critics.

In 2017, Isitt wrote, directed, and composed the music for a stage musical based on the first film in the Nativity! with her partner Nicky Ager. Nativity! The Musical ran from 20th October until 6th January and starred Daniel Boys, Simon Lipkin and Sarah Earnshaw. The show returned for a second tour in 2018. Simon Lipkin returned in the lead role as Mr. Poppy, joined by Scott Garnham and Ashleigh Gray. Garnham and Gray for a third tour in 2019, with Scott Paige playing the show's comic lead. However, Lipkin returned to reprise his role for the Hammersmith Apollo run of the show. The musical was ran at the Birmingham Rep for the 2022 Christmas season, after initially being postponed from 2020 and 2021 due to the COVID-19 pandemic.

Isitt also directed the ITV series Love and Marriage, and most recently wrote and directed the family comedy Christmas On Mistletoe Farm for Netflix. The film stars Scott Garnham, Scott Paige and Kathryn Drysdale.

Controversy
Actors Robert Webb and Olivia Colman publicly criticized the Confetti upon release. The pair play a couple of naturists planning their wedding, and claim they were mislead about the amount of nudity involved in the film. Webb said in an interview that Isitt had told them there genitals would all be pixelated in the final film, and was not aware until the screening that this was not the case. Colman and Webb started legal proceedings against the filmmaker, but these were eventually abandoned when the actors concluded it was too late and the lengthy process would prevent them from "pretending it didn't happen".

References

External links

Living people
English radio actresses
English women film directors
1966 births
English television actresses
English film actresses
People from Birmingham, West Midlands